Chaloem La 56 Bridge, popularly known as Hua Chang Bridge (สะพานหัวช้าง; lit: elephant's head bridge), is a bridge in Bangkok's Thanon Phetchaburi sub-district, Ratchathewi district and Wang Mai sub-district, Pathum Wan district. The bridge crosses Khlong Saen Saep (Saen Saep canal) on Phaya Thai Road.

Chaloem La 56 Bridge is one of the three remaining bridges of the Chaloem bridge series. The other two are Chaloem Phan 53 Bridge in Bang Rak and Sathon districts, with Chaloem Lok 55 Bridge nearby. On March 18, 1975 it was registered as one of the ancient monuments of Bangkok.

References

1909 establishments in Siam
Bridges in Bangkok
Pathum Wan district
Ratchathewi district
Registered ancient monuments in Bangkok